MM3 may refer to:

 MM3 (force field), a class of force fields in chemistry
 mm3, a cubic millimetre or microlitre
 Mm3, a cubic megametre or zettalitre, Litre#SI prefixes applied to the litre
 Mega Man 3, a 1990 video game for the NES
 Might and Magic III: Isles of Terra, a 1991 video game for the PC and many other platforms
 Mega Man III (Game Boy), a 1992 video game for the Game Boy
 Midtown Madness 3, a 2003 video game for the Xbox
 The Minuteman III intercontinental ballistic missile.
 MM3 register, a CPU register used by the MMX extension